Immorality (German: Unmoral) is a 1928 German silent film directed by Willi Wolff and starring Ellen Richter, Nicolas Rimsky and Georg Alexander.

Plot

Cast 
 Ellen Richter as Yvonne Longval  
 Nicolas Rimsky as Professor Thomas Barlet  
 Georg Alexander as Ernest Barlet  
 Kurt Gerron as Matrosenemil  
 Albert Paulig as Bartels Diener  
 Evi Eva as Sekretärin  
 Camilla von Hollay as Darsteller aus der Operette  
 Sig Arno as Darsteller aus der Operette  
 Henry Bender as Darsteller aus der Operette  
 Toni Tetzlaff as Darsteller aus der Operette  
 Hermann Böttcher as Darsteller aus der Operette

References

Bibliography 
 Bock, Hans-Michael & Bergfelder, Tim. The Concise Cinegraph: Encyclopaedia of German Cinema. Berghahn Books, 2009.

External links 
 

1928 films
Films of the Weimar Republic
German silent feature films
Films directed by Willi Wolff
1928 drama films
German drama films
Films scored by Paul Dessau
German black-and-white films
Silent drama films
1920s German films
1920s German-language films